Alan O'Neill may refer to:

 Alan O'Neill (footballer, born 1937), English football player for Sunderland and Aston Villa
 Alan O'Neill (footballer, born 1957), Irish football player and manager of Shamrock Rovers
 Alan O'Neill (footballer, born 1973), Irish football player for Birmingham City
 Alan O'Neill (soccer), English soccer player
 Alan O'Neill (actor) (1971–2018), Irish actor